Chthamalophilidae is a family of barnacles belonging to the infraclass Rhizocephala.

Genera:
 Bocquetia Pawlik, 1987
 Boschmaella Bocquet-Védrine, 1968
 Chthamalophilus Bocquet-Védrine, 1957

References

Barnacles
Crustacean families